This is a list of films which placed number-one at the weekend box office in Chile during 2017. Amounts are in American dollars.

Films

Highest-grossing films

References

2017 in Chile
2017
Chile